Waylla Tira (Aymara waylla Stipa obtusa, a kind of feather grass, tira cradle, "feather grass cradle", Hispanicized spelling Huayllatira) is a  mountain in the Andes of Bolivia. It is located in the Potosí Department, Tomás Frías Province, Potosí Municipality. Waylla Tira lies east of the Challwiri River, an affluent of the Pillku Mayu.

References 

Mountains of Potosí Department